Unity Credit Union Limited formally Manchester Unity Credit Union Limited is a not-for-profit member-owned financial co-operative, based in Manchester and operating throughout the United Kingdom. The credit union was first established for members of the Independent Order of Oddfellows by Manchester Unity Friendly Society in 1991.

History

The credit union traces its roots to Manchester Unity (No 1) Credit Union, which was founded in the English Midlands in 1991, followed by Manchester Unity (No 2) Credit Union in North London in 1994 and Manchester Unity (No 3) Credit Union in Yorkshire in 1997. In 1999, the Treasury announced that credit unions would be brought within the mainstream regulatory scheme administered by the Financial Services Authority. With little growth and increasing legislation, talks took place between the credit unions and the Board of the Oddfellows bringing all three together in 2001. As of January 2022, Manchester Unity Credit Union underwent a complete rebrand to now be called Unity Credit Union. They continue to uphold their slogan 'People Helping People' but felt the new name would help make them less geographically restricted as they have and are allowed members all over the UK.

Activities
Membership of (Manchester) Unity Credit Union is restricted by a common bond to members of the Oddfellows or Foresters, or a member of the same household who is a relative. New members can join both the Oddfellows and the credit union at the same time, which entitles them to the benefits of both organisations for a single monthly contribution.

A member of the Association of British Credit Unions Limited, (Manchester) Unity Credit Union is authorised by the Prudential Regulation Authority and regulated by the Financial Conduct Authority and the PRA. Ultimately, like the banks and building societies, members' savings are protected against business failure by the Financial Services Compensation Scheme.

See also
Credit unions in the United Kingdom
British co-operative movement
Oddfellows

References

External links 
Manchester Unity Credit Union
Association of British Credit Unions

Independent Order of Oddfellows Manchester Unity
Credit unions of the United Kingdom
Companies based in Manchester
Banks established in 1991